The decibel (dB) is a unit of measurement.

Decibel may also refer to:

Music
 Decibel (band), an Italian punk rock band
 Decibels (album), an album by Razor
 "Decibel", a song by AC/DC on the album Black Ice

Other uses
 Decibel (film), 2022 South Korean film
 Decibel (company), former name of Quantone, a company providing a music discovery metadata database
 Decibel (magazine), a heavy metal periodical
 Decibel Festival, an electronic music and visual art event
 Chamber (comics) or Decibel, a fictional character from the Marvel Universe

See also 
 Decebal (disambiguation)